Meade is a surname, and may refer to:

Actors
Ada Meade (1883-1965), American actress
Emily Meade (active from 2006), American actress
Garth Meade (1925–2002), South African comedian/actor, active in Australia since 1970
Mary Meade (1923–2003), American film actress of the 1940s

Artists and musicians
Alexa Meade (born 1986), American artist
Angela Meade (born 1977), American opera singer
Tyson Meade, singer and songwriter

Military
Arthur Meade, 5th Earl of Clanwilliam (1873–1953), British army officer and politician 
George Meade (1815–1872), American Civil War general
Richard Meade, 4th Earl of Clanwilliam (1832–1907), British Royal Navy officer
Richard John Meade (1821–1894), British Indian army general
Richard Worsam Meade I (1778–1828), American merchant and art collector
Richard Worsam Meade II (1807–1870), American naval officer
Richard Worsam Meade III (1837–1897), American naval officer
Robert Leamy Meade (1842–1910), officer in the United States Marine Corps

Politicians and ambassadors
Arthur Meade, 5th Earl of Clanwilliam (1873–1953), British army officer and politician 
Edwin R. Meade (1836–1889), lawyer and U.S. Congressman
Hugh Meade (1907–1949), U.S. Congressman
Sir John Meade, 1st Baronet (1642–1707), Irish barrister, judge and politician, Member of the Parliament of Ireland 1689–1707
John Meade, 1st Earl of Clanwilliam (1744–1800), Irish peer and Member of the Parliament of Ireland for Banagher 1764–67
John Meade (British Army officer) (–1849), Member of the UK Parliament for County Down 1805–12
José Antonio Meade (born 1969), Mexican politician and economist who pursued the PRI nomination for the 2018 presidential elections
Reuben Meade (born 1952), politician from Montserrat
Richard Meade, 3rd Earl of Clanwilliam (1795–1879), British ambassador
Richard Kidder Meade (1803–1862), lawyer and U.S. Congressman from Virginia
Robert Henry Meade (1835–1898), Head of the British Colonial Office
Wendell H. Meade (1912–1986), lawyer and U.S. Congressman in Kentucky

Religion
Charles Meade (1916-2010), Christian group leader
Marie Meade (born 1947), Yup'ik tradition bearer
William Meade (1789–1862), United States Episcopal bishop

Sport
Charles Francis Meade (1881–1975), British mountaineer and author 
James "Jim" Gordon Meade (1914–1977), American football player
McPherson Meade (born 1979), Montserratian cricketer
Neville Meade (1948-2010), British boxer
Noel Meade, Irish trainer of racehorses
Raphael Meade (born 1962), English football (soccer) player
Richard Meade (1938-2015), British equestrian and Olympic gold medal winner
Richie Meade, American lacrosse coach
Seán Meade (born 1937), Gaelic footballer

Writers
Charles Francis Meade (1881–1975), British mountaineer and author 
Gerald Willoughby-Meade (1875–1958), British author who wrote about the supernatural in Chinese folklore
Glenn Meade  (born 1957), Irish author
L. T. Meade (1854-1914), pseudonym of Elizabeth Thomasina Meade Smith, an English writer of girls' stories
Marion Meade (born 1934), American biographer

Other
Carl J. Meade (born 1950), NASA astronaut
David Meade, conspiracy theorist and book author, predicted that a hidden planet called Nibiru would collide with Earth on September 23, 2017
Edmund Meade-Waldo (1855–1934), English ornithologist and conservationist
James Meade (1907–1995), British economist and winner of the 1977 Nobel Prize in Economics
Michael J. Meade (born mid-1940s), Mythopoetic branch of the Men's Movement
Robin Meade (born 1969), television news anchor
Richard Henry Meade  (1814–1899), British entomologist & Arachnologist
Theodosia Meade, Countess of Clanwilliam (1744–1817), landowner in Ireland

Fictional characters
Alexis Meade, character in Ugly Betty
Bradford Meade, character in Ugly Betty
Claire Meade, character in Ugly Betty
Daniel Meade, character in Ugly Betty

See also
Mead (disambiguation)
Meade (disambiguation)
Mead family
Meades, a surname
Meads (disambiguation)